Herina is a genus of flies in the family Ulidiidae. It is possibly the largest genus in the family.

It is a genus of distinctive, small to medium-sized, dark species  about 3.5-5.5 mm long, with patterned wings. The head is variably yellowish, reddish, or darkened, whilst the body is either shining black or black dusted with grey. Many are found in marshland or calcareous grassland locations and in coastal wetlands.

Species
Species include:

H. aartseni Merz, 2002
H. frondescentiae (Linnaeus, 1758) 
H. germinationis (Rossi, 1790)
H. ghilianii Rondani, 1869 
H. gyrans (Loew, 1864) 
H. lacustris (Meigen, 1826) 
H. liturata Robineau-Desvoidy, 1830
H. lugubris (Meigen, 1826) 
H. merzi Kameneva, 2007 
H. nigrina (Meigen, 1826) 
H. oscillans (Meigen, 1826) 
H. paludum (Fallén, 1820) 
H. palustris (Meigen, 1826) 
H. parva (Loew, 1864) 
H. pseudoluctuosa Hennig, 1939 
H. rivosecchii Merz, 2002
H. scutellaris Robineau-Desvoidy, 1830
H. tristis (Meigen, 1826) 
H. yunnanica Kamaneva, 2006

References

Ulidiidae
Brachycera genera
Taxa named by Jean-Baptiste Robineau-Desvoidy